Hope were an English five-piece girl group consisting of Charlie Mole, Emily Biggs, Raquelle Gracie, Leah Lauder and Phoebe Brown, who found fame on the fourth series of The X Factor, originally a six-piece before prior to the live shows, Sisi Jghalef was forced to step down after it was discovered that she had an outstanding criminal conviction.

The X Factor
The members of Hope auditioned originally as soloists but did not make it past bootcamp. However, judge Louis Walsh suggested that they re-audition as a six-piece, with the group originally containing a sixth member, Sisi Jghalef. After reaching the judges' homes stage and being told that they had made it through to the final twelve, it emerged that Jghalef had an outstanding criminal conviction. This went against the rules of the competition and the show's producers asked her to leave the group. On 3, 17 and 24 November, they were in the bottom two but were saved by the judges on the first two occasions, and by the public vote on the other (due to the result going to deadlock). Hope were eliminated in the quarter-final by public vote.

After The X Factor
Since leaving the show Hope have performed at various events around the UK including The Birmingham Clothes Show and have booked their first international date in Dubai. They announced three tracks from their debut album: "Hot", "This Is It" and "I Apologize", which features Pharrell Williams.

At some point between October and November 2008, Leah Lauder was removed from the Hope website and all traces of her existence in the band were deleted. There was no official announcement from the group about her disappearance; however, it has been rumored that she left to become a solo artist, and she wished the band luck and is still in contact with some of them.

It was revealed on MTV UK Television's The Celebrity Agency that Hope went through a temporary split. This suggests that the band probably reformed without Leah Lauder, explaining her sudden disappearance from their website. As of 28 April 2009, the band's official website was taken down and it is presumed that Hope is on hiatus.

Solo careers
Brown subsequently joined the group Girls Can't Catch, signed to Fascination Records, the same label as Girls Aloud. However, the group disbanded after its two singles, "Keep Your Head Up" and "Echo" failed to meet expectations.

Biggs joined the group Parade. Their debut single "Louder" reached the top 10 in the UK singles chart while their follow-up, "Perfume", peaked at number 38. Parade's self-titled debut album was released in October 2011 but failed to enter the top 100. The group were dropped from their label in 2012 and split in early 2013.

Gracie now hosts the news/gossip web series "Daily Dips" on Dipdive.

Mole now works as a Senior Recruitment Consultant.

References

The X Factor (British TV series) contestants
English girl groups
Musical groups established in 2007
Musical groups disestablished in 2009